Dharmraj Singh Patel is an Indian politician from Phulpur, Allahabad constitution from Samajwadi Party. He is also the previous member of Phulpur (Lok Sabha constituency) from Samajwadi Party.

References

Living people
Samajwadi Party politicians
India MPs 1999–2004
Politicians from Allahabad
Lok Sabha members from Uttar Pradesh
Year of birth missing (living people)